The Bobby Witcher Society (BWS) is registered non-profit reptile and amphibian group in the United States dedicated to the study and appreciation of herpetology.  The society funds a scholarship to support student members of the Society for the Study of Amphibians and Reptiles who are engaged in herpetological study and research.  Member groups exist at Avila University and the University of Missouri.

History
BWS was co-founded by Dean E. (Doc) Metter in the late 1970s.  The Bobby Witcher Scholarship was renamed in his honor in 2003 and is now known as the Dean E. Metter Memorial Award.

External links
 Dean E. Metter Memorial Award
 Exempt Status

Organizations based in Philadelphia
Herpetology organizations